Proporidae is a family of acoels.

Taxonomy

Genera
There are 14 genera recognised in the family Proporidae.
Adenocauda Dörjes, 1968
Afronta Hyman, 1944
Deuterogonaria Dörjes, 1968
Haplogonaria Dörjes, 1968
Haploposthia An der Lan, 1936
Kuma Marcus, 1950
Parahaplogonaria Dörjes, 1968
Parahaploposthia Dörjes, 1968
Polycanthus Hooge, 2003
Praeanaperus Faubel & Regier, 1983
Proporus Schmidt, 1848
Pseudohaplogonaria Dörjes, 1968
Pseudokuma Dörjes, 1968
Simplicomorpha Dörjes, 1968

Species
The following species are recognised.

Notes

References

Acoelomorphs
Monogeneric animal families